St Edward's School is a public school (English fee-charging boarding and day school) in Oxford, England. It is known informally as 'Teddies'.

Approximately sixty pupils live in each of its thirteen houses. The school is a member of the Rugby Group, the Headmasters' and Headmistresses' Conference, and the Oxfordshire Independent and State School Partnership. Termly fees in 2022/2023 are £14,433 for boarding and £11,550 for day pupils. The school is also affiliated to the Church of England.

The school teaches the GCSE, A Level and International Baccalaureate (IB) qualifications. The sixth form is split evenly between pupils studying A Levels and the IB Diploma.

History

The school was founded in 1863 by Thomas Chamberlain, student of Christ Church, Oxford and vicar of St Thomas the Martyr's Church, Oxford. The original school building was Mackworth Hall, which then stood on New Inn Hall Street in central Oxford.

In 1873, after a storm damaged the school buildings and in anticipation of growing numbers, A. B. Simeon, the first Warden, moved the school to Summertown. At the time, the site was on the boundary of Oxford and surrounded by farmland, and Simeon bought a large plot for the school. The school remains on the  site today, with the Quadrangle and playing fields on opposite sides of Woodstock Road.

Simeon created an independent school with monastic-style buildings around a quadrangle. The original buildings were designed by William Wilkinson. The north range was built in 1873 and 1886, the gatehouse in 1879, and the east range, including Big School and the library, in 1881. Wilkinson's most significant building at St Edward's is the chapel, built in 1876.

The school flourished under the guidance of warden Henry Ewing Kendall from 1925 to 1954.

In the Second World War, air raid shelters were dug into the grass of the Quad. The school was presented with a stained glass window by the RAF at the end of the war in recognition of "the superb contribution to the war effort made by former pupils of the School".
These included, among many others, Guy Gibson of 617 Squadron, who led 'The Dambusters', flying ace Douglas Bader, and Adrian Warburton, famous for his role in the defence of Malta. Pacifist inclinations during the 1970s and 1980s caused the window to be relocated, before it was put back on display in the Old Library. The window has since been moved again and can now be seen on display in the warden's dining room. The school also has a scholarship fund to assist pupils whose parents are in the armed forces.

In 1982, the sixth form became co-educational. The whole school became fully co-educational in 1997.

Recent history

The school opened a new music centre in January 2017, the Ogston Music School. It expands the musical repertoire of the school, with 20 practice rooms, seven ensemble rooms, the large Weston Recital Room, a rock room, the Fenton Recording Studio, and the Ferguson Sixth Form Music Library.

In 2016, the school announced a new building project to complete the school's main Quad. The new development, designed by architect Nick Hardy (TSH Architects) and completed in 2020, includes a purpose-built Library, a university-style academic centre, and a new hall, with a capacity for 1,000 people.

July 2007 marked the official opening of The North Wall Arts Centre. The centre was built on the site of the old school swimming pool, which was the oldest swimming pool in the country.
The North Wall Arts Centre is run by co-artistic directors Ria Parry and John Hoggarth, and is a producing theatre.

The North Wall Arts Centre won several major architectural awards for its design, including a RIBA award.

The Martyrs Pavilion, designed by architect John Pawson, was opened in 2009 and won the 2010 Oxford Preservation Trust award in the New Buildings category.

Houses
There are 13 boarding houses lived in by approximately 60–70 boys or girls. Each house is run by housemaster or housemistress who is a member of the teaching staff at the school and lives in accommodation within the house with their family. Each house also has a set of house tutors who supervise prep (homework) during the week and also tutor members of the house. Each house also has a matron who looks after pupils' medical (and often social) needs.

The school has around 120 day pupils, a small proportion of the total.

Sport
The sports on offer for girls include hockey, netball, tennis and rowing, while the main sports offered for the boys include rugby, hockey, cricket, rowing and football.

In rowing the St Edward's School Boat Club has won The Princess Elizabeth Challenge Cup at Henley Royal Regatta on four occasions. The only British schools to have won the event more than this are Eton College and St Paul's School, London. In 1984 the 1st VIII became the first ever crew to achieve the 'Triple', winning all three School events that year: The School's Head of the River; The Queen Mother Cup at the National Schools Regatta and The Princess Elizabeth Challenge Cup at Henley Royal Regatta. In 2013 the boys 1st VIII boat rowed in the fastest Princess Elizabeth Challenge Cup final ever seen at Henley, chasing the holders Abingdon School down to within half a length. Both crews beat the existing course record, having dispatched other leading international schools on the way to the final. In 2014, the boys 1st VIII were again the losing finalists. Having won Henley events seven times, (including three years as winners of the now discontinued Special Race for Schools) and been the losing finalist seven times, St Edward's School is the one of the most successful boys' rowing schools. The school regularly provides rowers for Great Britain junior crews before going on to compete in the annual Oxbridge boat race or at Ivy League Universities.

St Edward's has seen several successful spells in hockey, which have included making the National Finals for both boys' and girls' hockey. The girls' hockey has been particularly strong and teams are frequently County Champions. In 2013/14 the school had both boys and girls in Regional, National and Great Britain squads. In 2010 the boys' hockey 1st XI won the inaugural Charlie Barker Trophy, a competition between local rival schools including Radley College, Eton College, Marlborough College, Abingdon School and Cheltenham College and finished the season unbeaten. Most recently, in 2018 the girls' U16 and U14 sides won their County tournaments with the 1st XI also progressing to the Regional tournament.

The 1st XV enjoyed a successful season in 2017, winning 10 matches and losing two, finishing 13th in The Daily Mail Trophy. 2017 was a good year for St Edward's further down the age-groups too, with the Junior Colts A (U15) and Junior Colts B XVs both recording seasons of 10 wins from 11 matches. In 2018, the 1st XV were crowned County Champions for Oxfordshire after beating Cokethorpe School in the final. There are some six former or present pupils in their respective age group's England development squads/teams including James Forrester.

The 2013 cricket season was one of the most successful in the School's history for the 1st XI. It included victories over Radley College, Harrow, Uppingham School and Cheltenham College. In 2017, the 1st XI began the season with a historic win over Oxford MCCU in University Parks, going on to achieve 18 victories in the season - the second highest ever - the team was also crowned South Central T20 Champions. Former pupil AJ Woodland was announced as the Wisden School's Cricketer of the Year for 2016 and other accolades for current pupils included selection for England U17s, an England U19s Invitational XI, and a variety of representational and county sides.

The school has many inter-house sporting events including the Steeplechase, and inter-house rowing, rugby, hockey, netball, squash, swimming and football, among others. The Steeplechase is the school's annual cross country race and is held once a year with the seniors running a  race across Port Meadow the floodplain of the River Thames.

Alumni (OSE)

Former pupils of St Edward's are known as Old St Edward's, abbreviated to OSE.

Notable OSE include:
 Sir Peter Abbott, former Vice-Chief of the Defence Staff
 Sir Douglas Bader, WWII pilot
 Arthur Banks, WWII pilot awarded GC
 Antony Barrington Brown, photographer and explorer
 Geoffrey Wallis Steuart Barrow, British historian and academic
 Sir Russell Bencraft, cricketer
 Pippa Bennett-Warner, actress
 John Berger, art critic, novelist, painter, and author
 Neil Biswas, screenwriter, playwright and film and television director
 Richard Brooke, cricketer
 Nicholas Budgen, Conservative MP
 Sir Harold Burrough, Assistant Chief of the Naval Staff in WWII
 Sir Geoffrey Callender, naval historian
 Richard Carline, artist
 Peter Carter-Ruck, lawyer
 David Frederick Case, audiobook narrator
 Emilia Clarke, Four-time Emmy nominated actress
 Brian Cleeve, author and broadcaster
 Joshua Compston, gallerist
 Anthony Cooke (Royal Navy officer), President of the Royal Naval College, Greenwich
 John Davies, businessman and cabinet minister
 Sir Geoffrey de Havilland, founder of de Havilland Aircraft Company.
 Richard Dinan, businessperson
 George Fenton, Oscar nominated film composer
Gabriel Fielding ("Alan Barnsley") author, W.H. Smith Literary Award Outstanding Contribution to English Literature 1963
 Anthony FitzClarence, 7th Earl of Munster
 James Forrester, England rugby union international
 Paul Gibb, England Test cricketer
 Guy Gibson, Dambusters hero,
 Robert Gittings, poet and biographer
 Jon Goodridge, rugby player
 John Galbraith Graham, crossword compiler (Araucaria)
 Kenneth Grahame, author
 Ernest George Henham, author
 Mark Herdman, diplomat, Governor of the British Virgin Islands (1986–1991)
 Sir Tom Hopkinson, journalist
 Noel Baring Hudson, Anglican Bishop
 Hugh Ingledew, Welsh rugby union international
 Stewart Innes, British Rower
 Poppy Jamie, TV Presenter
 Sir David Lewis, Lord Mayor of the City of London
 James Lockyer, Canadian lawyer and social activist
 Andrew MacLachlan, Scottish actor and cricketer
 Rob Marris, Labour MP
 Arthur Miller, cricketer
 Norman Miscampbell, Conservative MP
 Georgia Tennant, actress
 Sir John Moreton, diplomat
 Simon Nicholls, BBC comedy producer
 Laurence Olivier, actor, director and producer
 Sir Derek Oulton
 Hugh Padgham, record producer
 Florence Pugh, Oscar nominated actress
 Sir Nicholas Pumfrey, judge
 Ernest Read, cricketer
 Georgina Rylance, actress
 Michael Sandberg, former CEO of HSBC Group
 John Sandoe bookseller 
 John Silver, early member of rock band Genesis
 Jon Snow, Channel 4 newscaster
 Harmeet Singh Sooden, political activist
 Gordon Strachan, unorthodox minister
 Louis Strange, WW1 pilot
 Sir David Thorne
 Sir Brian Tovey, former director of GCHQ
 Sir Stephen Tumin, judge
 Sam Waley-Cohen, Grand National and Cheltenham Gold Cup winning jockey
 William Wallace, Baron Wallace of Saltaire
 Adrian Warburton, World War II British pilot
 Sir Barry Wilson
 Sir Francis James Wylie, first warden of Rhodes House
 Teddy Wynyard, cricketer and footballer
 Kelvin Ho-Por Lam, Hong Kong district councillor, political activist, former HSBC economist

Notable masters
Notable masters of the school include:
 James Cope, first-class cricketer (master in charge of cricket)
 David Conner, Dean of Windsor; former Bishop to the Forces (former school Chaplain)
 A. Maitland Emmet, became one of Britain's foremost authorities on microlepidoptera
 Sir George Mallaby, public servant (a former housemaster)

International links

The school has built up links with a number of schools around the world, which include:
 Mayo College, India.
 An exchange programme was set up in 1997 which saw a lower sixth boy study at Mayo and a lower sixth boy from Mayo study at Teddies.
 The Gilman School Baltimore, USA.
 Gilman and St. Edward's operate a scholarship known as the Hardie Scholarship. One Lower Sixth boy from St. Edward's studies at Gilman during March/April and a Junior from Gilman studies at St. Edward's during June.
 Roland Park Country School, Baltimore, USA.
 In 2004 St. Edward's established an exchange programme with Roland Park. The programme runs at the same time as the Harry Hardie Scholarship, with one lower sixth girl from St. Edward's studying at Roland Park and a Junior girl from Roland Park studying at St. Edward's.
 The Doon School, India.
 An exchange programme was set up in 2002 which saw a lower sixth boy study at Doon School and a lower sixth boy from Doon study at Teddies.
 The King's School, Parramatta
 King's traditionally play Teddy's once every two years during their UK Rugby tour. Teddies played King's in Sydney for the first time in 2003.

Arms
The school received a grant of arms in December 2017.

References

External links
 St Edward's School website
 Profile at the Good Schools Guide
 Profile at the Independent Schools Council website

Private schools in Oxfordshire
Schools in Oxford
Boarding schools in Oxfordshire
Co-educational boarding schools
Member schools of the Headmasters' and Headmistresses' Conference
Educational institutions established in 1863
1863 establishments in England
International Baccalaureate schools in England
Church of England private schools in the Diocese of Oxford